Gerardo Braggiotti (born c. 1953) is an Italian banker. A former Deputy Chairman of Lazard, he serves as the Chief Executive Officer of Gruppo Banca Leonardo.

Early life
Gerardo Braggiotti was born circa 1953. He graduated from Sciences Po in Paris, France. He received a PhD in Law from the University of Milan. He is an Associate of the Institute of Chartered Accountants in England and Wales.

Career
Braggiotti began his career at General Electric, an American energy corporation, in Milan, Italy.  He then worked for Arthur Andersen, an American accounting firm, in London for four years. Later, he worked at Mediobanca, an Italian investment bank, for fifteen years. He joined Lazard in 1998, and served as its Deputy Chairman until 2005.

Since 2006, he has served as the Chief Executive Officer of Gruppo Banca Leonardo. In 2015, he sold Banca Leonardo to the US investment firm Houlihan Lokey, who in turn sold it to Crédit Agricole in 2017. In 2017, he launched the equity fund Sprint Italy.

In February 2019, he became Goldman Sachs' country advisor for Italy.

Personal life
He is married, and has two daughters.

References

Living people
Sciences Po alumni
University of Milan alumni
Italian bankers
Italian chief executives
Year of birth missing (living people)